Final Four of the Adriatic League was held on 20 to 21 March 2021 in Stara Zagora.

Semifinals

For third place

Final

Bracket

Notes
 All times given below are in Eastern European Time.

References

External links
Official website

Final Four